is a Japanese boy band formed through the reality competition show Produce 101 Japan. The group is composed of eleven members: Issei Mamehara, Ren Kawashiri, Takumi Kawanishi, Shosei Ohira, Shion Tsurubo, Ruki Shiroiwa, Keigo Sato, Syoya Kimata, Junki Kono, Sukai Kinjo, and Sho Yonashiro. JO1 is the first Produce 101 winning group that is intended to be permanent. It is managed by Lapone Entertainment, a joint company between Yoshimoto Kogyo and CJ ENM.

Debuting with the single Protostar on March 4, 2020, JO1 has achieved six consecutive Oricon number-one singles as well as five number-one songs and one number-one album on the Billboard Japan Hot charts. Among the group's accolades are one Japan Gold Disc Award, three MAMA Awards, and three MTV Video Music Awards Japan.

Name 
The group's name "JO1" was chosen by Lapone Entertainment among the suggestions given by the public (called "national producers") through Produce 101 Japan official website. According to the original suggestion, the letter "J'" in the name refers to Japan, the group's origin country, while the "O1" refers to the first year of the Reiwa, the period the group was first introduced. However, "JO1" officially means that "the trainees who have dreamed together at Produce 101 Japan will become one and aim for the top of the world". The name was announced during the final episode of the show.

History

2019: Formation through Produce 101 Japan 

JO1 was formed through the reality competition show Produce 101 Japan from September 25 to December 11, 2019. A total of 6,000 people not tied to any talent agency auditioned for the show. Out of the initial 101 trainees participating in the show, the final 11 were chosen by viewers through online voting and announced via a live television broadcast on TBS. There was no plan to limit the period of the group's activity after its debut.

Before appearing on the show, several members had already been active in the entertainment industry. Ren Kawashiri is a former backup dancer, having performed for SMAP, FT Island, Dreams Come True, Tomohisa Yamashita, Lead, Wanna One, and Pentagon. Ruki Shiroiwa is a former member of Johnny's Jr., the trainee group of Johnny & Associates. He was also part of the voice actor music group Tsukicro in 2017, where he sang and portrayed the character Ruki Hibiya. Shosei Ohira is a former member of EXPG Sword, a performance unit specially established by Naoki Kobayashi of Exile and EXPG Kyoto.

2020: Debut and The Star
Shortly after the end of Produce 101 Japan, JO1 flew to South Korea to prepare and produce their debut single, Protostar. The single was released on March 4, 2020, and received an immediate commercial success by peaking at number one on the Oricon Singles Chart with over 300,000 copies sold, making JO1 the seventh artist who managed to do so with a debut single. Its lead track, "Infinity", also peaked atop the Billboard Japan Hot 100. On March 24, JO1 had their first live television performance on the NTV's morning show Sukkiri.

On August 26, JO1 released their second single, Stargazer, with Hui from the South Korean boy band Pentagon co-producing the lead track "Oh-Eh-Oh". Unlike Protostar, the training and production for the single were conducted remotely due to the COVID-19 pandemic. Stargazer features first participation by members in the production; group leader Sho Yonashiro and dance leader Ren Kawashiri did the lyrics and choreography for the track "My Friends". On September 5, JO1 performed as the headliner for the 31st Mynavi Tokyo Girls Collection Autumn/Winter 2020 in the Saitama Super Arena.

JO1 released their first studio album, The Star, on November 25. It features all songs from their two singles and seven new songs. The album debuted at second place on the Oricon Albums Chart and the Japan Hot Albums behind Be by BTS. On December 2, JO1 made their first appearance at the FNS Music Festival by performing the album's promotional single, "Shine a Light".  The group held their first live-streaming concert, Starlight, on December 19, amassing an estimate of 120,000 viewers from over 30 countries. By the end of the year, JO1 was awarded Rising Star Award by the MTV Video Music Awards Japan and Mnet Asian Music Award for Best Asian Artist. The group was later named as one of Best 5 New Artists at the Japan Gold Disc Award alongside SixTones, Snow Man, NiziU, and Yoasobi for their net sales in 2020.

2021–present: Open the Door and Kizuna
In February 2021, JO1 performed in South Korea for the first time by appearing on M Countdown and held their second online concert, Starlight Deluxe. Their third single, Challenger, was released on April 28, which includes Kit Kat Japan's commercial song "Tsutaerareru Nara" and Japan Hot 100 chart-topper "Born to be Wild". With over 298,000 copies sold, it eventually became the eleventh best-selling single in the first half of 2021.

JO1's fourth single, Stranger, was released on August 18, 2021, preceded by the release of "Freedom" and the opening theme song for the television drama , "Dreaming Night". Both songs charted in Japan Hot 100 while the lead track "Real" peaked atop the chart. Stranger was the group's fastest single to surpass 400,000 copies sold on the Billboard Japan charts. It was JO1's first performance with a live audience since they had debuted due to the COVID-19 pandemic. On October 9, Lapone Entertainment announced that member Sukai Kinjo, who had missed the concert, would suspend his activities after being diagnosed with adjustment disorder to receive treatment.

On November 19–21, JO1 held their first live concert, the 2021 JO1 Live "Open the Door",  at the Makuhari Messe instead of the planned national tour, to comply with the COVID-19 preventive measures. Between the five shows, the concert amassed a total of 45,000 audiences in attendance. It featured songs from the group's fifth single Wandering. The single was supported by double lead tracks,  and "Prologue". Prior to his break, Kinjo managed to participate in the recording of the single except for the song "Oasis". Upon its release on December 15, Wandering became the group's first single to earn a double platinum certification by the Recording Industry Association of Japan (RIAJ) for over a half million units in shipments.

On February 14, 2022, JO1 announced that Kinjo would resume his activities. On April 22, JO1 released the digital single "YOLO-konde", produced by 3Racha of Stray Kids. The song's concept planning and lyrics writing process by JO1 was depicted on the NHK special This Is JO1 - Go to the Dream. On May 25, JO1 released their second studio album, Kizuna, which features selected songs from the previous three singles in addition to nine new songs, including "Dreamer" and "Move the Soul", the opening theme of Aniplex's original anime series Fanfare of Adolescence. It was the group's first number-one album on the Oricon Albums Chart and Japan Hot Albums. To promote the album, JO1 embarked on their first arena tour to five prefectures throughout September and October 2022, which amassed 110,000 audience in attendance.

In June, JO1 released their first English song, "All Hours", for YSL Beauty Japan. On October 12, 2022, the group released their sixth single, Midnight Sun, supported with the lead track "SuperCali", which became their first single to surpass 600,000 copies sold on the Billboard Japan charts during its release week. By the end of 2022, JO1 was reported to rank high on several Billboard Japan year-end charts, with the group charting in top ten for the top album and single sales as well as at number 25 on the Artist 100 chart. JO1 made their first appearance on the NHK's annual New Year's eve musical show Kōhaku Uta Gassen by performing their debut song, "Infinity".

JO1 is slated to release their seventh single, Tropical Night, on April 5, 2023, with "Tiger" as the lead track. The single will include "We Good" and "Romance", which served as theme songs of television series  and Blue Birthday, starring members Syoya Kimata and Tsurubo Shion, respectively.

Members 

  – dance, vocals
  – vocal leader, vocals
  – dance, vocals
  – performance leader, dance, vocals
  – dance, rap
  – rap, vocals
  – leader, vocals
  – dance, rap
  – vocals, rap
  – rap, dance
  – vocals, rap, dance

Other ventures

Endorsements 
JO1 have maintained various domestic endorsement deals, ranging from national brands, such as ABC-MART x NIKE, FamilyMart, Francfranc, FuRyu, and Y!mobile, to international ones like Louis Vuitton and TikTok among others. They also have lent their images for campaigns by national organizations such as Japan Racing Association and JA Kyosai. In 2021, JO1 launched an eponymous electricity plan package in collaboration with Osaka Gas. They also signed a one-year "official beauty partner" contract with YSL Beauty Japan and were later appointed as the brand's first male ambassador in the following year. The group was former official ambassador of Credit Saison's concept card Likeme, and they have been acting as the brand ambassador of Kit Kat Japan after previously worked for their campaigns. In 2022, JO1 and Sanrio launched eleven new characters as an alter ego of the group, collectively named . The character designs were based on original ideas and sketches by the group's members. The group also held a Christmas collaboration with the department store Shibuya 109 and was appointed as the ambassador of Hot Japan with JO1, a project promoting the charms of Japan both domestically and internationally, with the support of government agencies and private sectors, including GMO Internet Group, Mitsui Fudosan Group, and ANA X.  Throughout the years, JO1 has been featured on the front covers of magazines such as Aera, An An, Elle Japan, Nylon Japan, and Vivi.

Philanthropy 
During the 10th anniversary of the Great East Japan Earthquake on March 11, 2021, JO1 and the social platform service Heyhey organized a special charity event in which all the collected funds would be donated to a foundation supporting the reconstruction of the affected areas. A total of about 4,000 people participated and raised around ¥1.85 million ($17,000).

On March 3, 2022, members Sho Yonashiro and Ren Kawashiri along with other Yoshimoto Kogyo's entertainers Kiyoshi Nishikawa and Tōru Hotohara met Prime Minister Kishida at his office to create a video encouraging people from all generations to take the booster shot of COVID-19 vaccine. Released on Yoshimoto Kogyo's official YouTube channel on March 17, the video explains the importance and side effects of the booster dose, aiming to help alleviate the public's concerns about vaccinations.

Discography

Studio albums
 The Star (2020)
 Kizuna (2022)

Concert tours
Tours
 2022 JO1 1st Arena Live Tour "Kizuna" (2022)
One-off concerts
 2021 JO1 Live "Open the Door" (2021)
Online concerts
 JO1 1st Live Streaming Concert "Starlight" (2020)
 JO1 Live Streaming Concert "Starlight Deluxe" (2021)

Filmography

Film

Television

Web series

Radio

Bibliography

Audio books

Photobooks

Awards and nominations

Listicles

Notes

References

External links 
 JO1 official website (in Japanese)

JO1
2019 establishments in Japan
Japanese boy bands
Japanese dance music groups
Japanese idol groups
Japanese pop music groups
Musical groups established in 2019
Produce 101
Produce 101 contestants
Singing talent show winners